The Edgar A. Poe Memorial Award is a prize for journalistic excellence that is awarded by the White House Correspondents Association (WHCA). The prize, which paid $2500 in 2011, is funded by the New Orleans Times-Picayune in honor of its distinguished correspondent Edgar Allan Poe (1906–1998), a former WHCA president unrelated to the American fiction writer of the same name.

The Edgar A. Poe Award is presented at the annual dinner of the WHCA. The award honors excellence in news coverage of subjects and events of significant national or regional importance to the American people. A list of recipients can be found in the article on the WHCA.

References

American journalism awards